Reusser is a surname. Notable people with the surname include:

Eugene Reusser (1922–2010), American football coach
Francis Reusser (1942–2020), Swiss film director
Kenneth L. Reusser (1920–2009), United States Marine Corps aviator
Marlen Reusser (born 1991), Swiss cyclist